Spring Gardens is a census-designated place (CDP) in Nueces County, Texas, United States. The population was 563 at the 2010 census. Prior to the 2010 census Spring Gardens was part of the Spring Garden-Terra Verde CDP.

Geography
NAME is located at  (27.761529, -97.741873).

References

Census-designated places in Nueces County, Texas
Census-designated places in Texas
Corpus Christi metropolitan area